Jean-Emmanuel Gilibert (21 June 1741, in Lyon – 2 September 1814, in Lyon) was a French politician, botanist, freemason, medical doctor and member of the Academy of Sciences, Humanities and Arts of Lyon.

Bibliography

 Dictionnaire historique de Lyon, Éditions Stéphane Bachès, 2009. .
 Piotr Daszkiewicz (2004). « Sur les forêts de Lithuanie » (1784), Un texte oublié de Jean-Emmanuel Gilibert. Cahiers lituaniens, 5 : 21-27.
 Adrien Davy de Virville (ed.) (1955). Histoire de la botanique en France. SEDES (Paris) : 394 p.
 Jules Guiart, La vie extraordinaire d’Emmanuel Gilibert, médecin et botaniste lyonnais, dans Biologie médicale, revue des sciences biologiques considérées dans leurs rapports avec la médecine, vol.34, 42/43e années, n°10-12, octobre-novembre-décembre 1945, pp. 164–190

1741 births
1814 deaths
Politicians from Lyon
19th-century French botanists
19th-century French physicians
Scientists from Lyon
Physicians from Lyon